Brampton-en-le-Morthen is a small dormitory village and former civil parish, now in the parish of Thurcroft, in the Rotherham district lying to the south of Rotherham, South Yorkshire, England. In 1911, the parish had a population of 148.

The village is located directly south-west of Thurcroft, west of Laughton en le Morthen and south-east of Morthen and Whiston.

History 
Brampton en le Morthen was formerly a township in the parish of Treeton, from 1866 Brampton en le Morthen was a civil parish in its own right until 1 April 1923 when it was abolished and merged with Treeton parish.

References 

Villages in South Yorkshire
Former civil parishes in South Yorkshire
Thurcroft